The Pennsylvania Railroad operated dozens of named passenger trains, and in fact, was the largest passenger train operator in the US.

All trains discontinued unless otherwise noted.

A
The Admiral 
Washington,  — New York, 
renamed The Constitution
The Admiral 
Chicago,  — New York, NY
The Advance Congressional 
New York, NY — Washington, DC
The Advance East Coast Champion  
New York, NY — Miami, 
The Advance Federal 
Boston,  — Washington, DC
Advance Florida Special  
New York, NY — Miami, FL
The Advance General 
Chicago, IL — New York, NY
renamed The Admiral
The Advance Golden Arrow 
New York, NY — Chicago, IL
renamed The Golden Arrow
The Advance Senator 
Washington, DC — Boston, MA
The Advance Senator 
Washington, DC — Boston, MA
through cars from Birmingham Special and Camillia
The Advance Silver Meteor 
New York, NY — Miami, FL
renamed Silver Star
The Afternoon Congressional 
New York, NY — Washington, DC
The Afternoon Keystone 
New York, NY — Washington, DC
The Afternoon Steeler 
Pittsburgh, PA — Cleveland,  
Aiken-Augusta Special 
New York, NY — Charlotte,  — Aiken/Augusta,  
renamed Augusta Special
The Airway Limited 
New York, NY — Port Columbus, OH
as part of air-rail service to Los Angeles, 
Akron & Cleveland Express 
Chicago, IL — Pittsburgh, PA 
renamed Akron Express
Akron-Cleveland Express 
Chicago, IL — Pittsburgh, PA 
became train #142
Akron Express 
Chicago, IL — Pittsburgh, PA 
renamed Pittsburgh Night Express
The Akronite 
New York, NY — Akron, OH 
The Alexandria 
New York, NY — Washington, DC
The All-Florida Special  
New York, NY — Florida 
renamed Orange Blossom Special
The All-Florida Special  
New York, NY — Florida 
The Allegheny 
St. Louis,  — Pittsburgh, PA
Altoona Express 
Philadelphia, PA — Altoona, PA
The American 
New York, NY — St. Louis, MO 
Anthracite Express 
Philadelphia, PA — Pottsville, PA — Wilkes-Barre, PA
The Arlington 
Washington, DC — New York, NY
Atlanta Special 
New York, NY — Washington, DC — Atlanta, GA 
Atlantic City & Washington Express  
Washington, DC — Atlantic City, NJ
renamed Washington & Atlantic City Express
Atlantic City & Washington Express  
Washington, DC — Atlantic City, NJ
renamed Atlantic City Express/Washington Express
Atlantic City Express/Washington Express  
Washington, DC — Atlantic City, NJ
Atlantic City Limited/New York Limited  
New York, NY — Atlantic City, NJ
Atlantic City Special  
Washington, DC — Atlantic City, NJ
renamed Atlantic City & Washington Express
Atlantic Coast Line Express 
St. Augustine, FL/Tampa, FL — Washington, DC — New York, NY 
Atlantic Coast Line Express 
Jacksonville, FL — Washington, DC — New York, NY 
renamed Coast Line Florida Mail
Atlantic Coast Line Limited 
Jacksonville, FL — New York, NY
Atlantic Express 
St. Louis, MO — Pittsburgh, PA 
Atlantic Express 
Chicago, IL — Columbus, OH — Pittsburgh, PA
renamed The Ohioan
Augusta Special 
New York, NY — Augusta, GA

B
Baltimore Day Express 
Buffalo, NY — Baltimore, MD — Washington, DC
Bankers Special 
Jersey City, NJ — Philadelphia, PA
Bar Harbor Express 
Washington, DC — Bangor,  — Rockland, ME
The Bay State 
Philadelphia, PA — New Haven,  — Boston, MA 
Birmingham Special 
New York, NY — Washington, DC — Atlanta, GA — Birmingham,  
The Blue Diamond 
Wilmington,  — Delmar, DE
6-month experimental train
Blue Grass Special 
Chicago, IL — Louisville, 
Boston Express 
Washington, DC — New York, NY — Boston, MA
renamed Federal Express
Boston & Southern Express 
Boston, MA — New York, NY — Washington, DC
renamed Federal Express
Boston & Washington Night Express 
Boston, MA — New York, NY — Washington, DC
renamed Fast Mail
Boston, Philadelphia & Washington Night Express 
Boston, MA — New York, NY — Philadelphia, PA — Washington, DC
renamed Boston & Washington Night Express
Boston-Pittsburgh-St. Louis Express 
Boston, MA — Pittsburgh, PA — St. Louis, MO
The Broadway Limited 
New York, NY — Chicago, IL
The Buckeye 
Cleveland, OH — Pittsburgh, PA 
The Buckeye 
Cincinnati, OH — Chicago, IL 
The Buckeye Limited 
Cleveland, OH — New York, NY 
renamed The Clevelander
Bucks County Express 
Philadelphia, PA Suburban Station — Trenton, NJ
Buffalo & Northern Express 
Philadelphia, PA — Buffalo, NY
The Buffalo Day Express 
Washington, DC — Baltimore,  — Harrisburg, PA — Buffalo, NY
Buffalo Express 
Buffalo, NY — Philadelphia, PA
Buffalo Night Express 
Washington, DC / Philadelphia, PA — Buffalo, NY
Buffalo, Erie & Philadelphia Express 
Buffalo, NY / Erie, PA — Philadelphia, PA
Buffalo Special 
Pittsburgh, PA — Buffalo, NY
The Bullet 
Easton, MD — Wilmington, DE

C
The Camilla 
New York, NY — Florida 
renamed The Sunland
Capital Express 
Pittsburgh, PA — Indianapolis,  — St. Louis, MO 
Capital Express 
Washington, DC — Pittsburgh, PA
Capitol Express 
Indianapolis, IN — Pittsburgh, PA
Carolina-Florida Special 
New York, NY — Florida 
renamed New York-Florida Limited
Carolina Golfer  
New York, NY — Raleigh, NC — Pinehurst, NC 
Carpenter Express 
Philadelphia, PA Suburban Station — Chestnut Hill, PA
Catskill Express 
Philadelphia, PA — Jersey City, NJ
The Cavalier 
New York, NY — Cape Charles,  via ferry boat Norfolk, VA
The Champion 
New York, NY — Miami, FL
The Champion (East Coast) 
New York, NY — east coast of Florida
renamed East Coast Champion
The Champion (West Coast) 
New York, NY — west coast of Florida
renamed West Coast Champion
Chesapeake & Ohio Express 
New York, NY — Washington, DC
renamed Southern Railway & Chesapeake & Ohio Express
Chester Countian 
Harrisburg, PA — Philadelphia, PA Suburban Station
The Chicago & Cincinnati Express 
Chicago, IL — Cincinnati, OH
renamed Cleveland & Cincinnati Express
The Chicago & New York Express 
Chicago, IL — Pittsburgh, PA
The Chicago & St. Louis Express 
New York, NY — Columbus, OH — Chicago, IL / St. Louis, MO 
split into St. Louis Express and Chicago Express
The Chicago Arrow 
Detroit,  — Chicago, IL
The Chicago Day Express 
Pittsburgh, PA — Chicago, IL
Chicago Daylight Express 
Louisville, KY / Cincinnati, OH — Chicago, IL
renamed The Red Bird
Chicago Daylight Special 
Louisville, KY / Cincinnati, OH — Chicago, IL
Chicago Express 
Louisville, KY / Cincinnati, OH — Chicago, IL
renamed Chicago Night Express
Chicago Express 
Pittsburgh, PA — Chicago, IL
renamed Metropolitan Express
Chicago Express 
Philadelphia, PA — Chicago, IL
Chicago Limited 
New York, NY — Chicago, IL 
renamed Manhattan Limited
Chicago Midnight Express 
Louisville, KY — Chicago, IL
renamed Chicago Night Express
Chicago Midnight Special 
Cincinnati, OH — Chicago, IL
renamed Chicago Night Express
Chicago Night Express 
Louisville, KY / Cincinnati, OH — Chicago, IL
Chicago Special 
Louisville, KY / Cincinnati, OH — Chicago, IL
renamed Chicago Daylight Special
Chicago Special 
renamed Metropolitan Express
The Chicagoan 
Washington, DC — Chicago, IL
Cincinnati & New York Express 
Cincinnati, OH — New York, NY
renamed Metropolitan Express
Cincinnati Commercial Express 
Pittsburgh, PA — Cincinnati, OH
Cincinnati Daylight Express 
Chicago, IL — Cincinnati, OH 
renamed The Red Bird
Cincinnati Express 
Pittsburgh, PA — Cincinnati, OH
renamed The Red Knight
Cincinnati Express 
Cincinnati, OH — Pittsburgh, PA
The Cincinnati Limited 
New York, NY — Cincinnati, OH
Cincinnati Midnight Express 
Chicago, IL — Cincinnati, OH
renamed The Southland
Cincinnati Midnight Special 
Chicago, IL — Cincinnati, OH
renamed Chicago Night Express
Cincinnati Night Express 
Cincinnati, OH — Logansport, IN — Chicago, IL
Cincinnati Special 
Chicago, IL — Cincinnati, OH
renamed Cincinnati Daylight Express
Cleveland & Cincinnati Express 
New York, NY — Cleveland, OH / Cincinnati, OH
renamed Cleveland, Cincinnati & Chicago Express
Cleveland, Cincinnati & Chicago Express 
New York, NY — Chicago, IL
Cleveland Express 
Pittsburgh, PA — Cleveland, OH
Cleveland Night Special 
Cleveland, OH — Columbus, OH
The Cleveland Special 
Pittsburgh, PA — Cleveland, OH
The Cleveland Special 
Cleveland, OH — Columbus, OH
The Cleveland-Youngstown-Pittsburgh Express 
Crestline, OH — Alliance, OH — Youngstown, OH — Pittsburgh, PA
The Clevelander 
New York, NY — Cleveland, OH
renamed The Buckeye Limited
The Clevelander 
New York, NY — Cleveland, OH 
Coast Line Florida Mail 
New York, NY — Jacksonville, FL 
The Colonial 
Boston, MA — New York, NY — Washington, DC
Colonial Express 
Boston, MA — New York, NY — Washington, DC
renamed The Colonial
Columbian Express 
Jersey City, NJ — Chicago, IL
for World's Fair
Commercial Express 
New York, NY — St. Louis, MO
The Commodore  
Philadelphia, PA — Long Branch, NJ
The Congressional 
New York, NY — Washington, DC
renamed The Afternoon Congressional
Congressional Express 
Washington, DC — New York, NY
renamed Congressional Limited Express
Congressional Limited 
New York, NY — Washington, DC
renamed The Congressional
Congressional Limited Express 
New York, NY — Washington, DC
renamed Congressional Limited
The Consolidated Champions 
New York, NY — Jacksonville, FL 
The Constitution 
New York, NY — Washington, DC
renamed The President
The Crescent 
New York, NY — Atlanta, GA — New Orleans,  
Crescent Limited 
New York, NY — New Orleans, LA 
renamed The Crescent
Cresson Special  
Pittsburgh, PA — Cresson, PA
Cyclone Express 
Chicago, IL — Cincinnati, OH
renamed train #12

D-E
Day Express 
Pittsburgh, PA — New York, NY
Dayton Express 
Chicago, IL — Dayton, OH — Springfield, OH
Daytonian 
Chicago, IL — Dayton, OH
Delaware Valley Express 
Philadelphia, PA — Trenton, NJ — East Stroudsburg, PA
Delaware Valley Express 
Philadelphia, PA Suburban Station — Trenton, NJ
Del-Mar-Va Express 
New York, NY — Philadelphia, PA — Cape Charles, VA via boat ferry Norfolk, VA
The Detroit Arrow 
Chicago, IL — Ft. Wayne, IN — Detroit, MI
Detroit Express 
Pittsburgh, PA — Detroit, MI
renamed The Fort Dearborn
Detroit Express 
Pittsburgh, PA — Detroit, MI
Dominion Express 
Washington, DC / Philadelphia, PA — Sunbury, PA — Buffalo, NY
The Duquesne 
New York, NY — Pittsburgh, PA
renamed The Keystone
The Duquesne Express 
New York, NY — Pittsburgh, PA 
renamed The Potomac
The Duquesne Special 
Buffalo, NY — Pittsburgh, PA
Early Bird Express 
Trenton, NJ — Philadelphia, PA Suburban Station
The East Coast Champion 
New York, NY — Miami, FL
renamed The Consolidated Champions
The East Wind  
Washington, DC — Worcester, MA — Lowell, MA — Exeter,  — Portland, ME — Bangor, ME
Eastern & Southern Express 
Chicago, IL — Louisville, KY
renamed Southern Express
Eastern Express 
Chicago, IL — New York, NY 
Eastern Mail 
Chicago, IL — New York, NY
renamed Mail
Eastern Mail 
St. Louis, MO — Pittsburgh, PA
The Edison 
New York, NY — Washington, DC
The Embassy 
New York, NY — Washington, DC
Erie & Philadelphia Express 
Erie, PA — Philadelphia, PA
renamed Buffalo, Erie & Philadelphia Express
Erie, Buffalo & Rochester Express 
Philadelphia, PA — Buffalo, NY / Erie, PA
Erie Express 
Harrisburg, PA — Erie, PA
Erie Express 
Pittsburgh, PA — Erie, PA
Erie Mail 
Harrisburg, PA — Erie, PA
split into Northern Express and Southern Express
Erie Night Express 
Erie, PA — Philadelphia, PA
Evening Keystone 
Washington, DC — New York, NY
The Everglades  
Boston, MA — New York, NY — Washington, DC — Florida 
merged into The Everglades Limited
The Everglades Limited  
Boston, MA — New York, NY — Washington, DC — Jacksonville, FL 
renamed Magnolia Limited
The Executive 
New York, NY — Washington, DC
Expo Train 
Pittsburgh, PA — Fort Wayne, IN — Columbia City, IN — Logansport, IN — St. Louis, MO
for World's Fair
Exposition Express 
St. Louis, MO — Columbus, OH — Akron, OH — Buffalo, NY 
for World's Fair
Exposition Flyer 
New York, NY — Atlanta, GA
for Cotton States Expo
renamed New York & Florida Short Line Limited

F
F.F.V. Limited 
New York, NY — Cincinnati, OH
Fast Line 
Philadelphia, PA — Pittsburgh, PA
split into Main Line Express and Philadelphia Express
among oldest named trains in the US
Fast Mail 
Boston, MA — Washington, DC
renamed Southern Fast Mail
Fast Mail 
New York, NY — Chicago, IL
renamed Chicago Special
Fast Mail 
Chicago, IL — New York, NY
renamed The New Yorker
Fast Southern Express 
New York, NY — Washington, DC — New Orleans, LA
renamed New York & Washington Fast Express
The Federal 
Boston, MA — Washington, DC
Federal Express 
Washington, DC — New York, NY — Boston, MA
renamed The Federal
The Flamingo 
New York, NY — Miami, FL 
The Flamingo 
Chicago, IL — Louisville, KY — Florida 
changed interchange point
The Flamingo 
Chicago, IL — Cincinnati, OH — Florida 
Florida & Metropolitan Limited 
New York, NY — Florida 
renamed Seaboard Express
Florida & Southwestern Express 
New York, NY — Tampa, FL / Memphis,  
renamed Norfolk & Western Railway & Southern Railway Express
Florida & West Indian Limited 
New York, NY — St. Augustine, FL / Tampa, FL 
renamed Havana Special
The Florida Arrow 
Chicago, IL — Louisville, KY — Birmingham, AL — Montgomery, AL / Miami, FL 
Florida East Coast Limited  
New York, NY — Miami, FL 
renamed Miamian
Florida Gulf Coast Limited  
New York, NY — St. Petersburg, FL
renamed Gulf Coast Limited
Florida Special 
Chicago, IL — Cincinnati, OH — Atlanta, GA — Macon, GA — Jesup, GA — St. Augustine, FL
The Florida Special  
New York, NY — Miami, FL
renamed Florida Special (East Coast)
The Florida Special 
New York, NY — Miami, FL
Florida Special (East Coast)  
Boston, MA — Miami, FL
renamed The Florida Special
Florida Special (West Coast)  
Boston, MA — Florida
renamed The Champion (West Coast)
Florida Sunbeam  
Boston, MA — Florida 
renamed Seaboard Fast Mail
Florida West Coast Limited  
New York, NY — St. Petersburg, FL 
renamed The Southerner
Floridian 
New York, NY — Florida 
renamed Orange Blossom Special
Flying Quaker 
Harrisburg, PA — Philadelphia, PA
renamed The Susquehannock
Flying Spray 
New York, NY — Atlantic City, NJ
Forest City Special 
Pittsburgh, PA — Cleveland, OH
renamed Cleveland Express
The Fort Dearborn 
New York, NY — Chicago, IL
split into Mid-City Express and The Golden Triangle
The Fort Duquesne 
Chicago, IL — Pittsburgh, PA
renamed Fast Mail
The Fort Hayes 
Columbus, OH — Bradford, OH — Logansport, IN — Chicago, IL
The Fort Pitt 
Chicago, IL — Pittsburgh, PA
Franklin City Express 
Philadelphia, PA — Ocean City, NJ / Franklin City, VA
The Furlough 
Philadelphia, PA — Cape Charles, VA
renamed The Mount Vernon

G-K
The General 
New York, NY — Chicago, IL
The Golden Arrow 
Chicago, IL — New York, NY
The Golden Triangle 
Chicago, IL — Pittsburgh, PA
The Gotham Limited 
Chicago, IL — New York, NY
The Governor 
Philadelphia, PA — Harrisburg, PA
renamed Pennsy Aerotrain
Gulf Coast Limited  
New York, NY — St. Petersburg, FL
Gulf Coast Special 
New York, NY — Tampa, FL
Harrisburg & Williamsport Express 
Philadelphia, PA — Williamsport, PA
renamed Williamsport Express
Harrisburg Express 
Philadelphia, PA — Harrisburg, PA
Harrisburger 
Philadelphia, PA Suburban Station — Harrisburg, PA
Havana Special 
New York, NY — Key West, FL 
renamed Gulf Coast Special
Indiana Arrow 
Chicago, IL — Logansport, IN — Louisville, KY / Richmond, IN
Indianapolis Limited 
New York, NY — Indianapolis, IN
International Express 
Washington, DC / Philadelphia, PA — Harrisburg, PA — Buffalo, NY
Iron City Express 
New York, NY — Pittsburgh, PA
The Jacksonian  
Chicago, IL — Louisville, KY — Miami, FL 
Jamestown Limited 
New York, NY — Portsmouth, VA — Memphis, TN / Birmingham, AL 
for Jamestown Tercentennial
The Jeffersonian 
New York, NY — St. Louis, MO
The Judiciary 
New York, NY — Washington, DC
renamed The Midday Congressional
The Juniata 
St. Louis, MO — New York, NY
The Juniata 
Pittsburgh, PA — New York, NY
The Kentuckian 
Chicago, IL — Louisville, KY
The Keystone 
New York, NY — Washington, DC
Keystone Express 
Chicago, IL — Jersey City, NJ

L
The Legion 
New York, NY — Washington, DC
renamed The Morning Congressional
The Legislator 
New York, NY — Washington, DC
Lehigh-Pennsylvania Express 
Phillipsburg, NJ — Easton, PA — Mount Carmel, PA — Sunbury, PA — Lock Haven, PA — Tyrone, PA — Altoona, PA 
renamed Pittsburgh-Wilkes-Barre Express
The Liberty Limited 
Washington, DC — Chicago, IL
Limited Mail 
New York, NY — Washington, DC
renamed Boston, Philadelphia & Washington Night Express
Lock Haven Express 
Philadelphia, PA — Lock Haven, PA
renamed Williamsport Express
Logansport and Fort Wayne Express 
Pittsburgh, PA — Ft. Wayne, IN — Columbia City, IN — Logansport, IN — St. Louis, MO
for World's Fair
London Limited 
Philadelphia, PA — Jersey City, NJ
Louisville Daylight Express 
Chicago, IL — Louisville, KY
renamed Blue Grass Special
Louisville Daylight Special 
Chicago, IL — Louisville, KY
Louisville Express 
Chicago, IL — Louisville, KY
renamed Louisville Daylight Special
Louisville Midnight Express 
Chicago, IL — Louisville, KY
renamed Chicago Night Express
Louisville Night Express 
Chicago, IL — Louisville, KY
renamed The Kentuckian
Louisville Special 
Chicago, IL — Louisville, KY
renamed Louisville Daylight Special

M
Magnolia Limited  
New York, NY — Florida 
renamed Tamiami
Main Line Express 
Pittsburgh, PA — Philadelphia, PA
The Manhattan 
Cleveland, OH — Pittsburgh, PA
renamed Iron City Express
Manhattan Limited 
New York, NY — Chicago, IL
The Mariner 
Philadelphia, PA — Cape Charles, VA via boat ferry Norfolk, VA
Memphis Special 
New York, NY — Memphis, TN 
renamed The Tennessean
Mercantile Express 
New York, NY — St. Louis, MO
renamed The Allegheny
Mercantile Express 
Pittsburgh, PA — Chicago, IL
renamed Progress Limited
The Metropolitan 
New York, NY — Chicago, IL
renamed Pittsburgh Day Express
Metropolitan Express 
New York, NY — Chicago, IL
split into The Metropolitan and The Metropolitan Limited
The Metropolitan Limited 
Cincinnati, OH — New York, NY
renamed The Cincinnati Limited
The Miamian  
New York, NY — Miami, FL 
The Mid-City Express 
Chicago, IL — Ft. Wayne, IN — Detroit, MI 
Mid-City Express 
Trenton, NJ — Philadelphia, PA Suburban Station
The Midday Congressional 
New York, NY — Washington, DC
The Midday Keystone 
New York, NY — Washington, DC
renamed The Legislator
The Midnight Keystone 
New York, NY — Washington, DC
The Mid-South Special  
New York, NY — Columbia,  
The Mid-West Express 
Washington, DC — Pittsburgh, PA
renamed Capital Express
The Mid-Westerner 
Pittsburgh, PA — Chicago, IL
renamed train #37
Monmouth Express 
Philadelphia, PA — Long Branch, NJ 
renamed The Sea Breeze
Montrealer/Washingtonian 
Washington, DC — Montreal, Canada 
The Morning Congressional 
New York, NY — Washington, DC
Morning Express 
New York, NY — Washington, DC 
renamed New York Day Express
The Morning Keystone 
Washington, DC — New York, NY
The Morning Steeler 
Pittsburgh, PA — Cleveland, OH 
The Mount Pocono Special  
Philadelphia, PA — Tobyhanna, PA
The Mount Vernon 
New York, NY — Washington, DC
The Mountaineer 
Philadelphia, PA — Pottsville, PA — Wilkes-Barre, PA

N
Nashville Express 
Buffalo, NY — Akron, OH — Columbus, OH — St. Louis, MO / Cincinnati, OH / Nashville, TN 
for World's Fair
Nellie Bly 
New York, NY — Atlantic City, NJ 
The New England Express 
Philadelphia, PA — Boston, MA
renamed The New Englander
The New Englander 
Pittsburgh, PA — New York, NY 
renamed The Junianta
The New Southland 
Chicago, IL — Ft. Wayne, IN — Ridgeville, IN — Richmond, IN — Cincinnati, OH — Atlanta, GA — Jacksonville, FL
renamed The Southland
New York Aiken-Augusta Special 
New York, NY — Aiken, SC / Augusta, GA 
renamed The Southeastern Limited
New York & Atlanta Express 
New York, NY — Atlanta, GA 
New York & Chicago Limited 
New York, NY — Chicago, IL
renamed Pennsylvania Limited
New York & Florida Express 
New York, NY — Aiken, SC / Augusta, GA — Florida 
New York & Florida Express  
New York, NY — Florida 
renamed New York-Florida Limited
New York & Florida Limited  
New York, NY — St. Augustine, FL 
renamed The Southern's Palm Limited
New York & Florida Short Line Limited  
New York, NY — St. Augustine, FL 
renamed New York & Florida Limited
New York & Florida Special  
New York, NY — Jacksonville, FL 
renamed Florida Special
New York & Memphis Limited 
New York, NY — Memphis, TN 
renamed Memphis Special
New York & New Orleans Limited 
New York, NY — Atlanta, GA — New Orleans, LA 
renamed Crescent Limited
New York & Norfolk Express 
New York, NY — Cape Charles, VA
New York & Richmond Express 
New York, NY — Richmond, VA
renamed New York & Washington Express
New York & Southern Express 
New York, NY — Washington, DC
renamed Chesapeake & Ohio Express
New York & Southern Express 
New York, NY — Washington, DC
split into Southern Railway Express and Atlantic Coast Line Express
New York & Southern Express 
New York, NY — Chicago, IL 
renamed Keystone Express
New York & Washington Fast Express 
New York, NY — Washington, DC
renamed New York & Washington Express
New York Day Express 
Washington, DC — New York, NY
renamed Washington & New York Express
New York Day Express 
Pittsburgh, PA — New York, NY
renamed The Juniata
New York Express 
Cape Charles, VA — New York, NY
New York Express 
St. Louis, MO / Chicago, IL — Ft. Wayne, IN — New York, NY
renamed New York Night Express
New York Express 
Pittsburgh, PA — New York, NY
New York-Florida Limited 
New York, NY — Florida 
renamed The Palmland
New York Limited 
Florida — New York, NY 
New York Limited Express/Washington Limited Express 
Washington, DC — New York, NY
renamed New York & Washington Express
New York Mail 
Pittsburgh, PA — Jersey City, NJ
New York Night Express 
Washington, DC — New York, NY
renamed Washington & New York Express
New York Night Express 
Pittsburgh, PA — New York, NY
New York-Richmond & Danville Express 
New York, NY — Atlanta, GA — New Orleans, LA
New York-Richmond Express/Richmond-New York Express 
New York, NY — Richmond, VA 
New York Special 
St. Louis, MO / Cincinnati, OH — Pittsburgh, PA — New York, NY
split into Iron City Express and Metropolitan Express
New York-Washington-Atlanta-New Orleans Express 
New York, NY — Washington, DC — Atlanta, GA — New Orleans, LA 
The New Yorker 
Chicago, IL — New York, NY
renamed The Fort Pitt
The New Yorker 
Washington, DC — New York, NY
The New Yorker 
Atlanta, GA — New York, NY 
News Express 
Baltimore, MD / Philadelphia, PA — Lock Haven, PA
renamed Newspaper Special
Newspaper Special 
New York, NY — Williamsport, PA
Niagara & Buffalo Express 
Philadelphia, PA — Buffalo, NY
Niagara 
Harrisburg, PA — Williamsport, PA — Ridgway, PA
Niagara Express 
Baltimore, MD / Philadelphia, PA — Emporium, PA — Buffalo, NY
renamed Niagara
Norfolk Express 
New York, NY — Cape Charles, VA
renamed The Cavalier
North Michigan Resorter  
Chicago, IL — Kalamazoo, MI — Grand Rapids, MI
renamed North Michigan Special 
North Michigan Special  
Chicago, IL — Kalamazoo, MI — Mackinaw City, MI 
renamed North Star
North Star  
Chicago, IL — Kalamazoo, MI — Mackinaw City, MI 
Name dropped.
Northern Arrow 
Cincinnati, OH — Mackinaw City, MI
Northern Express 
Washington, DC — New York, NY
renamed Washington, Philadelphia & Boston Night Express
Northern Express 
Washington, DC — Erie, PA / Canandaigua, NY
The Northland 
Cincinnati, OH — Mackinaw City, MI
renamed Northern Arrow
Northland Express  
Cincinnati, OH — Mackinaw City, MI
renamed Northland Limited
Northland Limited 
Cincinnati, OH — Mackinaw City, MI
renamed The Northland
Northwest Express 
Philadelphia, PA Suburban Station — Chestnut Hill, PA

O
Ohio & Virginia Express 
St. Louis, MO — Pittsburgh, PA 
renamed Atlantic Express
Ohio Valley Express 
Pittsburgh, PA — Wheeling, WV — Portsmouth, OH — Ironton, OH / Cincinnati, OH 
The Ohioan 
Chicago, IL — Columbus, OH 
renamed The Kentuckian
Oil City Express 
Pittsburgh, PA — Oil City, PA
Old Point Express 
Philadelphia, PA — Cape Charles, VA
renamed Del-Mar-Va Express
Orange Blossom Special  
New York, NY — West Palm Beach, FL 
Orange Blossom Special (West Coast)  
New York, NY — St. Petersburg, FL
Overnight Express 
Philadelphia, PA — Pittsburgh, PA

P
Pacific Express 
Jersey City, NJ — Chicago, IL 
The Palmetto 
New York, NY — Savannah, GA 
Palmetto Limited 
New York, NY — Tampa, FL 
renamed The Palmetto
The Palmland 
New York, NY — Miami, FL / St. Petersburg, FL
Panama-Pacific Express 
New York, NY — Columbus, OH — Chicago, IL
renamed Pan-Handle Express
Pan-American Express 
St. Louis, MO / Nashville, TN — Columbus, OH — Akron, OH — Buffalo, NY 
for World's Fair
Pan-Handle Express 
New York, NY — Chicago, IL 
renamed The Fort Hayes
Pan-Handle Limited 
New York, NY — Chicago, IL 
Passenger, Mail & Express 
New York, NY — Washington, DC — Jacksonville, FL
The Patriot 
Washington, DC — New York, NY
The Peach Queen 
New York, NY — Atlanta, GA — New Orleans, LA 
The Pelican 
New York, NY — Bristol, VA — Chattanooga, TN — New Orleans, LA 
Peninsula Express 
Baltimore, MD — Newark, NJ
Penn Center Express 
Chestnut Hill, PA — Philadelphia, PA Suburban Station
The Penn Texas 
New York, NY — St. Louis, MO 
Renamed.
Pennsy Aerotrain 
New York, NY — Pittsburgh, PA
experimental run of lightweight  Aerotrain
Pennsylvania & Shore Line Day Express 
Boston, MA — Philadelphia, PA
renamed Colonial Express
The Pennsylvania Limited 
New York, NY — Chicago, IL
Pennsylvania Special 
New York, NY — Chicago, IL
renamed Broadway Limited
The Pennsylvania-Wilkes Barre Express 
Wilkes-Barre, PA — Sunbury, PA — Lock Haven, PA — Altoona, PA
The Pennsylvanian 
New York, NY — Chicago, IL
Philadelphia & Baltimore Express 
Lock Haven, PA — Philadelphia, PA / Baltimore, MD
Philadelphia & Boston Express 
Philadelphia, PA — Boston, MA
Philadelphia & Washington Express 
Kane, PA — Philadelphia, PA
Philadelphia Express 
Jersey City, NJ — Chicago, IL
renamed Eastern Express
Philadelphia Express 
Pittsburgh, PA — Philadelphia, PA
renamed Day Express
Philadelphia Express 
Williamsport, PA — Philadelphia, PA
Philadelphia Night Express 
Pittsburgh, PA — Philadelphia, PA
renamed The Sea Gull
Philadelphia Night Express 
Pittsburgh, PA — Philadelphia, PA
Philadelphia Night Express 
Harrisburg, PA — Philadelphia, PA
renamed Chester Countian
Philadelphia Special 
Pittsburgh, PA — Philadelphia, PA
renamed Philadelphia Night Express
Philadelphian 
Pottsville, PA — Philadelphia, PA
Philadelphian 
Harrisburg, PA — Philadelphia, PA
Piedmont Limited 
New York, NY — Atlanta, GA — Montgomery, AL — New Orleans, LA 
The Pilgrim 
New York, NY — St. Louis, MO
renamed The St. Louisian
The Pilgrim 
Philadelphia, PA — Boston, MA
Pittsburgh & Chicago Express 
Philadelphia, PA — Pittsburgh, PA — Chicago, IL
renamed Chicago Express
Pittsburgh & Northern Express 
Philadelphia, PA / Washington, DC — Pittsburgh, PA
Pittsburgh Day Express 
Buffalo, NY — Pittsburgh, PA 
Pittsburgh Day Express 
New York, NY — Pittsburgh, PA
Pittsburgh Day Express 
Detroit, MI — Pittsburgh, PA
renamed The New Yorker
Pittsburgh Day Express 
New York, NY — Pittsburgh, PA
renamed The Metropolitan
Pittsburgh Express 
Philadelphia, PA — Pittsburgh, PA
renamed Pittsburgh & Chicago Express
Pittsburgh Express 
St. Louis, MO — Pittsburgh, PA
Pittsburgh Express 
Chicago, IL — Pittsburgh, PA
Pittsburgh Limited 
Pittsburgh, PA — New York, NY
split into New York Special and Pittsburgh Special
Pittsburgh Night Express 
Buffalo, NY — Pittsburgh, PA
Pittsburgh Night Express 
Philadelphia, PA — Pittsburgh, PA
renamed The Sea Gull
Pittsburgh Night Express 
Chicago, IL — Pittsburgh, PA
renamed Youngstown-New Castle Express
Pittsburgh Night Express 
Philadelphia, PA — Pittsburgh, PA
Pittsburgh Special 
Chicago, IL / Cleveland, OH / Toledo, OH — Pittsburgh, PA
Pittsburgh Special 
New York, NY — Pittsburgh, PA
renamed Iron City Express
Pittsburgh Special 
St. Louis, MO — Pittsburgh, PA — New York, NY
renamed Pittsburgh Express
Pittsburgh-Wilkes Barre Express 
Sunbury, PA — Altoona, PA
name dropped
The Pittsburgher 
Philadelphia, PA — Pittsburgh, PA
renamed Altoona Express
The Pittsburgher 
New York, NY — Pittsburgh, PA
Pocono Limited  
Philadelphia, PA — Stroudsburg, PA
Pocono Mountain Express  
Philadelphia, PA — Tobyhanna, PA
The Potomac 
Washington, DC — Pittsburgh, PA
renamed The Statesman
The Potomac 
New York, NY — Washington, DC
The President 
New York, NY — Washington, DC
northbound renamed The Morning Congressional
The Progress Limited 
Pittsburgh, PA — Chicago, IL
renamed The Mid-Westerner

Q-R
The Quaker 
Boston, MA — Philadelphia, PA
became NYNH&H-only train
Quaker City Express 
Pittsburgh, PA — Philadelphia, PA
renamed The New Englander
Queen Lane Express 
Philadelphia, PA Suburban Station — Chestnut Hill, PA
renamed Northwest Express
The Rainbow 
Chicago, IL — New York, NY
The Red Arrow 
Detroit, MI — Pittsburgh, PA — New York, NY
The Red Bird 
Chicago, IL — Ft. Wayne, IN — Detroit, MI 
The Red Bird 
Chicago, IL — Cincinnati, OH 
The Red Knight 
New York, NY — Chicago, IL
renamed The Rainbow
The Representative 
New York, NY — Washington, DC
Resort Special 
Cincinnati, OH — White Sulphur Springs,  — Hot Springs, VA — Washington, DC — New York, NY 
renamed West Virginian
Richmond & Danville Express 
New Orleans, LA / Augusta, GA / Memphis, TN — Washington, DC — New York, NY
Richmond & Danville Limited 
Philadelphia, PA — Washington, DC — Atlanta, GA / New Orleans, LA / Asheville, NC / Augusta, GA
Richmond & New York Express 
Richmond, VA — Washington, DC — New York, NY
renamed Washington & New York Express
Richmond Express 
New York, NY — Washington, DC — Richmond, VA
Richmond Night Express 
Richmond, VA — Washington, DC — New York, NY
renamed Southern Night Express
River Valley Express 
Philadelphia, PA — Pottsville, PA
The Robert E. Lee 
New York, NY — Washington, DC — Atlanta, GA — Birmingham, AL 
Rochester & Buffalo Express 
Washington, DC — Buffalo, NY

S
The Sailor 
Norfolk, VA via ferry boat Cape Charles, VA — New York, NY
The St. Louis & Chicago Express 
Pittsburgh, PA — Columbus, OH — St. Louis, MO
The St. Louis & Cincinnati Express 
St. Louis, MO — Cincinnati, OH — Chicago, IL 
renamed Chicago & St. Louis Express
St. Louis & Pittsburgh Special 
St. Louis, MO — Pittsburgh, PA
St. Louis, Chicago & Cincinnati Express 
Jersey City, NJ —  Cincinnati, OH — St. Louis, MO / Chicago, IL 
renamed The St. Louis & Cincinnati Express
St. Louis Express 
New York, NY — St. Louis, MO
renamed The Mercantile Express
St. Louis Express 
Pittsburgh, PA — St. Louis, MO 
St. Louis Express 
Washington, DC — Pittsburgh, PA
St. Louis Limited 
New York, NY — St. Louis, MO
renamed The Commercial Express
St. Louis Mail 
New York, NY — St. Louis, MO
St. Louis Special 
Pittsburgh, PA — St. Louis, MO 
The St. Louisan 
New York, NY — St. Louis, MO
renamed The Spirit of St. Louis
The St. Louisan 
New York, NY — St. Louis, MO
westbound train renamed The Juniata
The St. Louisan 
New York, NY — St. Louis, MO
Sandusky Fast Line  
Columbus, OH — Sandusky, OH
Sandusky Special  
Columbus, OH — Sandusky, OH
renamed Sandusky Fast Line
Saratoga Express 
Philadelphia, PA — New York, NY — Saratoga, NY 
Schuylkill 
Hazleton, PA — Philadelphia, PA
Sea Breeze 
Philadelphia, PA — Long Branch, NJ 
name dropped
The Sea Clipper  
New York, NY — Atlantic City, NJ
name dropped
Sea Gull 
Pittsburgh, PA — Atlantic City, NJ
split into Pittsburgh Night Express and Philadelphia Night Express
Sea Plane 
New York, NY — Atlantic City, NJ
name dropped
Sea-Shore Express 
Williamsport, PA — Philadelphia, PA
Seaboard Express 
New York, NY — Jacksonville, FL
renamed Florida-Cuba Special
Seaboard Express 
Chicago, IL — New York, NY 
renamed The Fort Hayes
Seaboard Fast Mail 
New York, NY — Washington, DC — Jacksonville, FL
renamed Seaboard Mail
Seaboard Fast Mail 
New York, NY — Washington, DC — Jacksonville, FL
renamed Florida Sunbeam
Seaboard Fast Mail 
New York, NY — Washington, DC — Jacksonville, FL
renamed Passenger, Mail & Express
Seaboard Florida Limited  
New York, NY — St. Augustine, FL 
renamed New York-Florida Limited
Seaboard Florida West Coast Limited  
Boston, MA — Tampa, FL / St. Petersburg, FL 
Seaboard Mail 
New York, NY — Washington, DC — Jacksonville, FL 
renamed Seaboard Fast Mail
Seashore Limited 
New York, NY — Chicago, IL 
renamed Manhattan Limited
Second Iron City Express 
Philadelphia, PA — Harrisburg, PA
The Senator 
Boston, MA — New York, NY — Washington, DC
Silver Comet 
New York, NY — Raleigh, NC — Atlanta, GA — Birmingham, AL 
Silver Meteor 
New York, NY — Miami, FL / St. Petersburg, FL
renamed
Silver Star 
New York, NY — Miami, FL
The South Wind 
Chicago, IL — Indianapolis, IN — Louisville, KY — Miami, FL 
Southeastern Limited  
New York, NY — Augusta, GA — Aiken, SC — Jacksonville, FL 
Southern & Boston Express 
Washington, DC — Boston, MA
renamed Boston Express
Southern & New York Express 
Washington, DC — New York, NY
renamed Washington & New York Express
Southern Day Express 
New York, NY — Washington, DC
renamed New York & Washington Express
Southern Express 
New York, NY — Tampa, FL 
renamed Atlantic Coast Line Express
Southern Express 
Erie, PA / Canandaigua, NY — Washington, DC / Philadelphia, PA
Southern Express 
Chicago, IL — Cincinnati, OH / Louisville, KY
renamed Louisville Night Express
Southern Night Express 
New York, NY — Washington, DC
renamed New York & Southern Express
Southern Night Express 
Washington, DC — New York, NY
renamed Atlantic Coast Line Express
Southern States Special 
New York, NY — St. Petersburg, FL / Birmingham, AL 
renamed The Sun Queen
The Southerner 
New York, NY — Florida 
renamed Southern States Special
The Southerner 
Pittsburgh, PA — Washington, DC
The Southerner 
New York, NY — New Orleans, LA 
The Southern's Palm Limited  
New York, NY — Charlotte, NC — St. Augustine, FL  
renamed Southeastern Limited
The Southland 
Chicago, IL — Ft. Wayne, IN — Ridgeville, IN — Richmond, IN — Cincinnati, OH — Atlanta, GA — Jacksonville, FL 
renamed The New Southland
The Southland 
Chicago, IL — Ft. Wayne, IN — Ridgeville, IN — Richmond, IN — Cincinnati, OH — Atlanta, GA — Jacksonville, FL 
renamed The Buckeye
Southwestern Express 
New York, NY / Cincinnati, OH / Louisville, KY / St. Louis, MO / Memphis, TN 
renamed St. Louis Express
The Speaker 
New York, NY — Washington, DC
The Spirit of St. Louis 
New York, NY — St. Louis, MO
renamed
The Statesman 
Washington, DC — Pittsburgh, PA
The Steel City Express 
Chicago, IL — Pittsburgh, PA
The Steel King 
New York, NY — Pittsburgh, PA
The Steeler 
Pittsburgh, PA — Cleveland, OH 
split into The Morning Steeler and The Afternoon Steeler
The Sun Queen 
New York, NY — Miami, FL / St. Petersburg, FL
renamed The Camillia
The Surfside 
Washington, DC — New York, NY — Laconia, NH — Plymouth, NH and Rockland, ME  
The Susquehannock 
Philadelphia, PA — Williamsport, PA

T-V
The Tamiami 
New York, NY — Florida 
split into The Tamiami-Champion (East Coast) and The Tamiami-Champion (West Coast)
The Tamiami-Champion (East Coast)  
New York, NY — Miami, FL 
renamed The Champion (East Coast)
The Tamiami-Champion (West Coast)  
New York, NY — St. Petersburg, FL 
renamed Champion (West Coast)
The Tar Heel 
New York, NY — Washington, DC — Wilmington, NC 
name dropped
The Tennessean 
New York, NY — Memphis, TN 
The Thirty-Seven
New York, NY — Washington, DC
The Trail Blazer 
New York, NY — Chicago, IL
name dropped
The 24-Hour St. Louis 
New York, NY — St. Louis, MO
renamed The St. Louisian
The Union 
Chicago, IL — Cincinnati, OH 
United States Fast Mail 
New York, NY — Atlanta, GA — New Orleans, LA 
renamed New York-Washington-Atlanta-New Orleans Express
The Vacationer  
New York, NY — Miami, FL 
Valley Special 
Chicago, IL — Orrville, OH — Alliance Jct., OH — Niles, OH — Youngstown, OH — Pittsburgh, PA
Vandalia-Toledo Day Express 
Toledo, OH — Terre Haute, IN
Vandalia-Toledo Night Express 
Toledo, OH — Terre Haute, IN

W-Z
Washington & Atlanta Express 
New York, NY — Washington, DC — Atlanta, GA / Aiken, SC — Savannah, GA 
renamed Washington & Florida Limited
Washington & Atlantic City Express 
Washington, DC — Atlantic City, NJ
renamed Atlantic City Special
Washington & Boston Night Express 
Washington, DC — Boston, MA
renamed Southern & Boston Express
Washington & Chattanooga Limited 
New York, NY — Washington, DC — Chattanooga, TN 
renamed Washington-Chattanooga-New Orleans Limited
Washington & Florida Limited 
New York, NY — Washington, DC — Charlotte, NC — Florida 
Washington & New York Fast Express 
Washington, DC — New York, NY
renamed Atlantic Coast Line Express
Washington & Philadelphia Express 
Buffalo, NY — Philadelphia, PA / Washington, DC
renamed Washington Express
Washington & Southwestern Limited 
New York, NY — Washington, DC — Atlanta, GA — New Orleans, LA 
renamed New York & New Orleans Limited
Washington Broadway Limited 
Washington, DC — Chicago, IL
renamed Liberty Limited
Washington-Chattanooga-New Orleans 
New York, NY — Bristol, VA — Chattanooga, TN — New Orleans, LA
renamed The Pelican
Washington-Chattanooga-New Orleans Limited 
New York, NY — Bristol, VA — Chattanooga, TN — New Orleans, LA 
renamed Washington-Chattanooga-New Orleans
Washington Day Express 
New York, NY — Washington, DC
renamed Southern Day Express
Washington Day Express 
New York, NY — Washington, DC
Washington Day Express 
Buffalo, NY — Washington, DC
renamed Washington & Philadelphia Express
Washington Express 
Buffalo, NY — Washington, DC
renamed Washington Day Express
Washington Express 
Pittsburgh, PA — Washington, DC
renamed Capital Express
Washington Express 
Pittsburgh, PA — Washington, DC
renamed The Potomac
Washington Express 
Buffalo, NY — Washington, DC
renamed Baltimore Day Express
Washington Night Express 
New York, NY — Washington, DC 
renamed Southern Night Express
Washington Night Express 
Buffalo, NY — Washington, DC
Washington, Philadelphia & Boston Night Express 
Washington, DC — Philadelphia, PA — New York, NY — Boston, MA
renamed Washington & Boston Night Express
Waterville Express 
Washington, DC — New York, NY — Portland, ME — Waterville, ME 
The Weekend Champion  
Miami, FL — New York, NY
Week-End Special   
Pittsburgh, PA — Erie, PA
The West Coast Champion 
New York, NY — Waycross, GA — St. Petersburg, FL
renamed The Champion
West Indian Limited 
New York, NY — Jacksonville, FL / west coast of Florida 
West Virginian 
Cincinnati, OH — White Sulphur Springs, WV — Hot Springs, VA — Washington, DC — New York, NY
The West Virginian 
Pittsburgh, PA — Fairmont, WV 
Western Express 
New York, NY — Pittsburgh, PA — Chicago, IL
The William Penn 
Boston, MA — New York, NY — Philadelphia, PA
Williamsport & Philadelphia Express 
Philadelphia, PA — Williamsport, PA
renamed Philadelphia Express
Williamsport Express 
Philadelphia, PA — Williamsport, PA
renamed Lock Haven Express
Williamsport Express 
Philadelphia, PA — Williamsport, PA
World's Fair Express 
Columbus, OH — St. Louis, MO
renamed World's Fair Special
World's Fair Special 
Pittsburgh, PA — St. Louis, MO 
renamed St. Louis Special
Youngstown-New Castle Express 
Chicago, IL / Cleveland, OH — New Castle, PA — Pittsburgh, PA
renamed Akron-Cleveland Express

References

Sources